Lal Hembrom  is an Indian politician. He was elected to the lower House of the Indian Parliament the Lok Sabha from Hazaribagh, Bihar as a member of the Indian National Congress.

References

External links
 Official biographical sketch in Parliament of India website

Indian National Congress politicians
India MPs 1952–1957
Lok Sabha members from Bihar
Year of death missing